USS Numitor (ARL-17) was to be laid down as an  but was instead laid down as one of 39 s landing craft repair ships built for the United States Navy during World War II. Named for Numitor (in Roman mythology, King Numitor of Alba Longa, son of Procas, and the father of Rhea Silvia), she was the only US Naval vessel to bear the name.

Construction
LST-954 was redesignated ARL-17 and named Numitor on 14 August 1944. Numitor was laid down on 19 September 1944, at Hingham, Massachusetts, by the Bethlehem-Hingham Shipyard; launched on 18 October 1944. After conversion by Bethlehem Key Highway Shipyard, Baltimore, Maryland, she was commissioned on 3 April 1945.

Service history
After shakedown in Chesapeake Bay, the landing-craft repair ship departed Norfolk, Virginia 12 May 1945; transited the Panama Canal; received additional gear on the West Coast, sailed via Pearl Harbor, the Marshall Islands, and Caroline Islands, and reached Okinawa, 10 August 1945. With the end of World War II her base of operations transferred to Sasebo, Japan, where the ship continued in occupation service from 22 September until 22 February 1946.

Returning to the United States, Numitor again transited the Panama Canal and arrived Orange, Texas, 17 June 1946. Initially assisting in the deactivation of other vessels, she was placed out of commission in reserve 1 July 1947. Struck from the Naval Vessel Register on 1 April 1960, Numitor was sold to the Southern Scrap Material Co., of New Orleans, Louisiana. The hull was later sold to the Dravo Corporation for conversion to a drydock.

Notes

Citations

Bibliography 

Online resources

External links
 

 

Achelous-class repair ships
Achelous-class repair ships converted from LST-542-class ships
World War II auxiliary ships of the United States
Ships built in Hingham, Massachusetts
1944 ships